The Lesser Antilles Volcanic Arc is a volcanic arc that forms the eastern boundary of the Caribbean Plate. It is part of a subduction zone, also known as the Lesser Antilles subduction zone, where the oceanic crust of the North American Plate is being subducted under the Caribbean Plate. This subduction process formed a number of volcanic islands, from the Virgin Islands in the north to the islands off the coast of Venezuela in the south.

References

 Macdonald, R., C.J. Hawkesworth, and E. Heath. (2000). The Lesser Antilles volcanic chain: a study in arc magmatism. Earth-Science Reviews, Volume 49, Issues 1-4, March 2000, Pages 1–76. .
 Christeson et al. (2003) Deep structure of an island arc backstop, Lesser Antilles subduction zone. Journal of Geophysical Research, V.108, p. 2327]

Further reading
 Bouysse et al. (1983) The Lesser Antilles Island Arc: Structure and Geodynamic Evolution

Volcanic arcs
Volcanic arc